Vincent Rolland (born 1 February 1970) is a French politician who has represented the 2nd constituency of the Savoie department in the National Assembly since 2017. A member of The Republicans (LR), he previously held the seat from 2002 to 2007 as Hervé Gaymard's substitute following the latter's appointment to the government.

Biography
A ski instructor by occupation, Rolland has held a seat in the Departmental Council of Savoie (General Council of Savoie until 2015) since 1998. First elected for Bozel, he has been a departmental councillor for the canton of Moûtiers since 2015. Rolland held one of the departmental council's vice presidencies from 2004 to 2017 under the presidency of Hervé Gaymard.

Rolland was a municipal councillor of Pralognan-la-Vanoise from 1995 to 1997, when he became Deputy Mayor of Pralognan-la-Vanoise, a position he held until 2008. He was a municipal councillor of Albertville from 2008 to 2017.

He served as the member of the National Assembly for the 2nd constituency of Savoie from 2002 to 2007, before regaining the seat in 2017 following Gaymard's retirement from parliamentary politics. Ahead of the 2022 presidential election, Rolland publicly declared his support for Michel Barnier as The Republicans' candidate.

References 

Living people
1970 births
Deputies of the 12th National Assembly of the French Fifth Republic
Deputies of the 15th National Assembly of the French Fifth Republic
Deputies of the 16th National Assembly of the French Fifth Republic
Rally for the Republic politicians
Union for a Popular Movement politicians
The Republicans (France) politicians
Politicians from Auvergne-Rhône-Alpes
People from Savoie
Departmental councillors (France)
French city councillors
Members of Parliament for Savoie